Scott Swinney (born December 6, 1968) is an American sports shooter. He competed in the men's 50 metre running target event at the 1988 Summer Olympics.

References

External links
 

1968 births
Living people
American male sport shooters
Olympic shooters of the United States
Shooters at the 1988 Summer Olympics
Place of birth missing (living people)
Pan American Games medalists in shooting
Pan American Games silver medalists for the United States
Pan American Games bronze medalists for the United States
Shooters at the 1991 Pan American Games
Medalists at the 1991 Pan American Games